Irad (Irad) is a name in Hebrew. In the Book of Genesis, the grandson of Cain is Irad.

Genesis 4:18, in a genealogical passage about the descendants of Cain, contains the only reference to Irad in the Bible: "To Enoch was born Irad; and Irad was the father of Mehujael, and Mehujael the father of Methushael, and Methushael the father of Lamech" (New Revised Standard Version).

The lineage of Cain in Genesis 4:17-22 closely parallels the lineage of Cain's brother Seth found in Genesis 5:1-32. In terms of the Documentary hypothesis, the genealogy of Cain is attributed to the Jahwist source, while the genealogy of Seth is attributed to the Priestly source. The J list and P list contain seven pairs of similar names, and the "Irad" of the Jahwist source is parallel to the "Jared" of the Priestly source.

Family Tree

References 

Book of Genesis
Persian masculine given names